Leptogium saturninum is a species of lichen belonging to the family Collemataceae.

It has cosmopolitan distribution.

References

Lichen species
saturninum
Taxa named by James Dickson (botanist)